Ystalyfera Rugby Football Club competed in the 2011-12 season of the National League Division 3 South West.

Having finished the season before with the glory of winning the West Wales Bowl for the first time, expectancy was high at the beginning of the season. Unfortunately a lethargic performance away to Vardre, coupled with a disappointing loss to Pencoed in the second away fixture, left a feeling of ‘something missed’ which in the end did prove somewhat true. At the end of the season these two defeats would turn out to be the only losses to sides that finished below Ystalyfera in the League. Much disruption throughout the season was caused by the Wales campaign in the World Cup Tournament, resulting in longer ‘gaps’ between games. Nevertheless, Ystalyfera did re-gain their form and very good performances in October saw an away victory at Seven Sisters and a close run thing at Maesteg Quins, who were defending an undefeated home record lasting over two years and who would eventually complete the league season winning every game played.

The home game against Taibach in November was lost by a single point and was an encounter which could have gone either way between sides of equal strength and ability. At the end of year/new year turnover Ystalyfera found their true capability, finishing impressive victories over Mumbles and Bryncoch, revenge defeats of Vardre and Pencoed, plus a Welsh Plate away win at struggling Aberavon Green Stars. This lifted the side to a 3rd placed promotion spot and raised confidence within the squad. A high quality 3rd Round defeat against now familiar opponents Glynneath was followed by commanding victories against Brynamman and the luckless Aberavon Green Stars away – this being Ystalyfera's best ever win away in the National League to date (0-68).

After the Welsh ‘Grand Slam’ during March, the ‘Fera then lost three consecutive games to the sides who would finish in the top three promotion spots in the league. Maesteg Quins would be relieved however, to know they would not have to visit the Upper Swansea Valley for at least another season after another ‘feisty’ match between the sides. Ystalyfera completed the League season at home to Aberavon Green Stars with what turned out to be an all-time record victory for the Club. A score of 114–8 saw an accumulation of a record 18 tries, most players to score (11) – this equal to the number of players to score in the away game versus the same side, and the most points scored in a single game achieved by Damian James (38), who also achieved a record 9 conversions. As the National League would re-structure to add the new Championship Division, no sides were relegated. This meant the Green Stars would become opponents for the next season as well. The last fixture was the final of the Swansea Valley Cup, which Ystalyfera won for the second time in their history with a 38-22 victory over Alltwen at Trebanos.

Player achievements;

The following players made an appearance in every game: Jonathan Williams (Prop), Jesse Patton (Lock), Steffan Jones (Back Row) and Phillip Thomas (Scrum Half/Full Back). 

Most Tries: Phillip Thomas (16) PB

Most Points: Dane Clancy (146) PB -  20 penalties and 28 conversions

Most Tries by a single player for the club: Damian James (144)

Most Points by a single player for the club: Damian James (1,609)

4 players in the current squad have to date made over 300 appearances for the team, 15 players with over 100 appearances and 17 who have scored over 10 tries for the side so far.

End of season awards:

Coaches Players of the Year (Backs): Craig Watkins

Coaches Players of the Year (Forwards): Steffan Jones.

Clubman Award: Damian James.

Most Improved Player: Ieuan Hopkins

Most Promising Player: Gareth Jones

Club (Committee) Player of the Year: Ashley Carter

Supporters Player of the Year: Steffan Jones (28% of the vote)

Players Player of the Year: Ashley Carter (21% of the vote)

National League Division 3 South West

Ystalyfera 2011/12 Season Results

Ystalyfera 2011/12 Season Player Stats

References

Sport in Neath Port Talbot